Public Health Agency may refer to:

Public Health Agency of Canada
Public Health Agency (Northern Ireland)
Public Health Agency of Sweden

See also
List of national public health agencies